The Fourteenth Minnesota Legislature first convened on January 2, 1872.

Members

Senate

House of Representatives

References

Minnesota legislative sessions
1872 in Minnesota
1873 in Minnesota